Finnish Argentine is an Argentine person of full, partial, or predominantly Finnish ancestry, or a Finnish-born person residing in Argentina.

Finnish immigration in Argentina began in the early twentieth century and was not as massive as those of other European nationalities. Currently, most of the descendants of Finnish immigrants live in the city of Oberá, Misiones.

The arrival 
The first Finnish immigrants who arrived relatively organized to Argentina, arrived in the country in 1906 and founded the "Colonia Finlandesa" (Finnish Settlement) near the city of Oberá. It was estimated that there were about 120 families. One of the pioneers of this wave was Arthur Thesleff. The reasons for the Finnish emigration seem to have been related to the repressive context that the country was in the early twentieth century because of the Russian occupation of the territory.

Oberá 

The Finns were one of the first foreign communities to settle in what is now the city of Oberá. At first, they called "Picada Finlandesa" to the three sections that were pooled city lots. This was because most of its inhabitants had come from Finland.

Other areas where they settled 
Besides Misiones, Finnish immigrant groups and their descendants settled in regions of the provinces of Corrientes, Córdoba and Buenos Aires.

Gastronomic traditions 
In their adaptation and integration into Argentina, Finnish immigrants-like the Swedes and Norwegians, continued with some of its gastronomic traditions. The Finns who settled in Misiones, continued the habit of cooking fish (particularly surubí) and its tradition of homemade biscuits with spices like cinnamon and cloves.

See also 
 Argentina–Finland relations
 Argentines of European descent
 Swedish Argentines
 Virpi Niemelä (Finnish-born Argentine astronomer)

References

External links 

 
Immigration to Argentina
European Argentine